The White Mansion, also known as the Asa L. White Mansion, is a historic house built in 1878 in Oakland, California. It has been listed on the National Register of Historic Places since October 31, 1980.

History 
It was built in 1878 for Asa L. White (1842–1924), a Canadian businessman who purchased the plot of land from the Remillard Brothers in 1877. The house was designed in the Italianate architectural style.

Asa White was nicknamed, "the father of hardwood on the Pacific coast". With his brothers Jacob and Peter, White was the co-founder of White Brothers, a construction subcontractor responsible for many houses in San Francisco. By the 1980s, the White Mansion still belonged to the White family.

See also 

 National Register of Historic Places listings in Alameda County, California
 List of Oakland Designated Landmarks

References

Houses on the National Register of Historic Places in California
National Register of Historic Places in Alameda County, California
Italianate architecture in California
Houses completed in 1878